The 1946 Presbyterian Blue Hose football team was an American football team that represented Presbyterian College as a member of the South Carolina Little Four during the 1946 college football season. In their sixth season under head coach Lonnie McMillian, the Blue Hose compiled a 7–2 record (3–0 against Little Four teams), won the Little Four championship, and outscored opponents by a total of 154 to 99. After losing the first two games of the season, Presbyterian won seven consecutive games to close the season.

Presbyterian's senior quarterback Hank Caver received first-team honors on the 1946 Little All-America college football team. Caver ranked second among small-college players with 790 passing yards (though he also led the country with 13 passes intercepted). He led a T-formation offense that was nicknamed "Operation Moon."

Three Presbyterian players received honors from the Associated Press on the 1946 All-South Carolina team: Caver on the first team; back Herbert Rollins on the second team; and end Dick Kaleel on the third team.

The team played its home games at the original Bailey Stadium in Clinton, South Carolina.

Schedule

References

Presbyterian
Presbyterian Blue Hose football seasons
Presbyterian Blue Hose football